Nos galan may refer to:

"Nos Galan", a Welsh winter carol; see "Deck the Halls"
Nos Galan road race, in memorial of Guto Nyth Brân